Fifty pence, 50p or 50P may refer to: 

 Fifty pence (British coin), one half pound sterling
 Fifty pence (Irish coin), one half of the now withdrawn Irish pound
 Fifty Pence, nickname of a fictional character from M.I.High
 Fifty Pence (or 50 Pence), pseudonym of Liam Don, a musician from Hemel Hempstead who has written parodies of 50 Cent songs
 50p, the frame rate

See also
Penny
Pound (currency)